Ojak Sar (also Romanized as Ojāk Sar; also known as Owjāksar) is a village in Babolrud Rural District, in the Central District of Babolsar County, Mazandaran Province, Iran. At the 2006 census, its population was 2,802, in 748 families.

References 

Populated places in Babolsar County